Pedro Ferriz Santacruz, (March 17, 1921 – September 3, 2013) was a veteran radio and television presenter in Mexico.

His long career includes programs such as Noticiario Nescafe, Las trece del trece and La Pregunta de los 64,000 Pesos (The $64,000 Question). One of his best-known programs is Un mundo nos vigila (A world is watching us), a radio show about the search for intelligent extraterrestrial life, which started on station XEW and was later broadcast on the Imagen Radio network until his death.

Ferriz Santacruz was a candidate for the Party of the Cardenist Front of National Reconstruction (PC) as a senator in 1991 and in 1997, the party's last election, for Head of Government of Mexico City. 

Pedro Ferriz Santacruz was the son of Pedro Ferriz Monroy, a railroader, and Josefina Santacruz, a school teacher, also was the father of radio and television news announcer Pedro Ferríz de Con and grandfather of announcer Pedro Ferriz Hijar.

References

1921 births
2013 deaths
Mexican radio presenters
Mexican television presenters
Mexican journalists
Mexican expatriates in the United States